Joseph Dawson is a retired English boxer.

Boxing career
Dawson was twice National Champion in 1978 and 1979 after winning the prestigious ABA light-flyweight title, boxing out of Boston ABC.

He represented England in the -48 kg light-flyweight division, at the 1978 Commonwealth Games in Edmonton, Alberta, Canada.

References

Living people
British male boxers
Boxers at the 1978 Commonwealth Games
Year of birth missing (living people)
Featherweight boxers
Light-flyweight boxers
Commonwealth Games competitors for England